

Background

Review 
The 2009 Columbus Crew season was the fourteenth season of the team's existence. It started with a 1-1 draw at the Houston Dynamo on March 21, 2009, and ended on November 5, with a 3-2 playoff loss to Real Salt Lake. The Crew lost 4-2 on aggregate.

Roster

As of June 20, 2009.

Competitions

Preseason

MLS

Standings

Eastern Conference

Overall table

Results summary

Results by round

Match results

CONCACAF Champions League

U.S. Open Cup

MLS playoffs

See also 
 Columbus Crew
 2009 in American soccer
 2009 Major League Soccer season

References

Columbus Crew seasons
Columbus Crew
Columbus Crew
Columbus Crew
2009